A puzzle is a game, problem, or toy that tests a person's ingenuity or knowledge. In a puzzle, the solver is expected to put pieces together (or take them apart) in a logical way, in order to arrive at the correct or fun solution of the puzzle. There are different genres of puzzles, such as crossword puzzles, word-search puzzles, number puzzles, relational puzzles, and logic puzzles. The academic study of puzzles is called enigmatology.

Puzzles are often created to be a form of entertainment but they can also arise from serious mathematical or logical problems. In such cases, their solution may be a significant contribution to mathematical research.

Etymology
The Oxford English Dictionary dates the word puzzle (as a verb) to the end of the 16th century. Its earliest use documented in the OED was in a book titled The Voyage of Robert Dudley...to the West Indies, 1594–95, narrated by Capt. Wyatt, by himself, and by Abram Kendall, master (published circa 1595). The word later came to be used as a noun, first as an abstract noun meaning 'the state or condition of being puzzled', and later developing the meaning of 'a perplexing problem'. The OEDs earliest clear citation in the sense of 'a toy that tests the player's ingenuity' is from Sir Walter Scott's 1814 novel Waverley, referring to a toy known as a "reel in a bottle".

The etymology of the verb puzzle is described by OED as "unknown"; unproven hypotheses regarding its origin include an Old English verb puslian meaning 'pick out', and a derivation of the verb pose.

Genres

Puzzles can be categorized as:

Lateral thinking puzzles, also called "situation puzzles"
Mathematical puzzles include the missing square puzzle and many impossible puzzles — puzzles which have no solution, such as the Seven Bridges of Königsberg, the three cups problem, and three utilities problem 
Sangaku (Japanese temple tablets with geometry puzzles)

A chess problem is a puzzle that uses chess pieces on a chess board. Examples are the knight's tour and the eight queens puzzle.
Mechanical puzzles or dexterity puzzles such as the Rubik's Cube and Soma cube can be stimulating toys for children or recreational activities for adults.
combination puzzles like Peg solitaire
construction puzzles such as stick puzzles
disentanglement puzzles,
folding puzzles
jigsaw puzzles. Puzz 3D is a three-dimensional variant of this type.
lock puzzles
A puzzle box can be used to hide something — jewelry, for instance.
sliding puzzles (also called sliding tile puzzles) such as the 15 Puzzle and Sokoban
tiling puzzles like Tangram
Tower of Hanoi

Metapuzzles are puzzles which unite elements of other puzzles.
Paper-and-pencil puzzles such as Uncle Art's Funland, connect the dots, and nonograms
Also the logic puzzles published by Nikoli: Sudoku, Slitherlink, Kakuro, Fillomino, Hashiwokakero, Heyawake, Hitori, Light Up, Masyu, Number Link, Nurikabe, Ripple Effect, Shikaku, and Kuromasu.
Spot the difference
Tour puzzles like a maze
Word puzzles, including anagrams, ciphers, crossword puzzles, Hangman (game), and word search puzzles. Tabletop and digital word puzzles include Bananagrams, Boggle, Bonza, Dabble, Letterpress (video game), Perquackey, Puzzlage, Quiddler, Ruzzle, Scrabble, Upwords, WordSpot, and Words with Friends. Wheel of Fortune (U.S. game show) is a game show centered on a word puzzle.
Puzzle video games
Tile-matching video game
Puzzle-platformer
Adventure game
Hidden object game
Minesweeper

Puzzle solving

Solutions of puzzles often require the recognition of patterns and the adherence to a particular kind of ordering. People with a high level of inductive reasoning aptitude may be better at solving such puzzles than others. But puzzles based upon inquiry and discovery may be solved more easily by those with good deduction skills. Deductive reasoning improves with practice. Mathematical puzzles often involve BODMAS. BODMAS is an acronym and it stands for Bracket, Of, Division, Multiplication, Addition and Subtraction. In certain regions, PEMDAS (Parentheses, Exponents, Multiplication, Division, Addition and Subtraction) is the synonym of BODMAS. It explains the order of operations to solve an expression. Some mathematical puzzles require Top to Bottom convention to avoid the ambiguity in the order of operations. It is an elegantly simple idea that relies, as sudoku does, on the requirement that numbers appear only once starting from top to bottom as coming along.

Puzzle makers

Puzzle makers are people who make puzzles.  In general terms of occupation, a puzzler is someone who composes and/or solves puzzles.

Some notable creators of puzzles are:

 Ernő Rubik
 Sam Loyd
 Henry Dudeney
 Boris Kordemsky
 David J. Bodycombe
 Will Shortz
 Oskar van Deventer
 Lloyd King
 Martin Gardner
 Raymond Smullyan

History of jigsaw and other puzzles

Jigsaw puzzles are perhaps the most popular form of puzzle. Jigsaw puzzles were invented around 1760, when John Spilsbury, a British engraver and cartographer, mounted a map on a sheet of wood, which he then sawed around the outline of each individual country on the map. He then used the resulting pieces as an aid for the teaching of geography.

After becoming popular among the public, this kind of teaching aid remained the primary use of jigsaw puzzles until about 1820.

The largest puzzle (40,320 pieces) is made by German game company Ravensburger. The smallest puzzle ever made was created at LaserZentrum Hannover. It is only five square millimeters, the size of a sand grain.

The puzzles that were first documented are riddles. In Europe, Greek mythology produced riddles like the riddle of the Sphinx. Many riddles were produced during the Middle Ages, as well. 

By the early 20th century, magazines and newspapers found that they could increase their readership by publishing puzzle contests, beginning with crosswords and in modern days sudoku.

Organizations and events

There are organizations and events that cater to puzzle enthusiasts, such as:

 Nob Yoshigahara Puzzle Design Competition
 World Puzzle Championship
 National Puzzlers' League
 Puzzlehunts such as the Maze of Games
World Cube Association

See also

References

Further reading

External links

 
 
 
Problem solving